Maison Ikkoku is a manga series written and illustrated by Rumiko Takahashi. It was serialized in Shogakukan's Big Comic Spirits from November 15, 1980 to April 20, 1987. It has been adapted into an anime series and a live action film and two episode TV drama. The plot follows Yusaku Godai, a rōnin who resides in an old apartment complex named Maison Ikkoku as he studies for the university entrance exam. Yusaku's life progression and interactions progress episodically and focuses on his growing relationship with the apartment manager, Kyoko Otonashi.

Shogakukan collected the individual chapters into fifteen tankōbon volumes between May 1982 and July 1987. The series was later republished in ten wide-ban volumes between July 1992 and April 1993. The ten volume format was later rereleased as bunkobans between December 1996 and April 1997. Shogakukan's third rerelease of the series follows the fifteen volume format which were released as a shinsōban edition between April 2007 and October 2007.

Viz Media licensed and translated Maison Ikkoku for English release in North America. Viz Media serialized the series as a comic book where each book featured a single chapter; the comic book issues were published between June 1992 and January 2000. The comic book format used a different chapter numbering and skipped some chapters; the artwork was also flipped to read left-to-right. The comic book chapters were collected and released in fourteen tankōbon graphic novel volumes between December 1994 and June 2000. Viz later re-released the series complete and un-flipped in the same format as Shogakukan's fifteen volume format between October 2003 and February 2006. Viz republished Maison Ikkoku in a "collector's edition" based on the Japanese wide-ban, with the first volume released on September 15, 2020, and the tenth and last on December 27, 2022.

Chapter list

Volume releases

Japan

Fifteen volume release format

Ten volume release format

North America

Comics

Tankōbon release

Collector's Editions

References

Chapters
Maison Ikkoku